Teresea M. "Terry" Hayes (born May 5, 1958) is an American politician from Maine who served as the Maine State Treasurer and a candidate for Governor of Maine in 2018. A political independent, Hayes represented part of Oxford County, Maine, including her residence in Buckfield, Maine, as a Democrat from 2006 to 2014. She was unable to seek re-election to the Maine House of Representatives in 2014 due to term-limits.

Following Hayes' 2010 re-election, she was named Assistant Minority Leader of the House Democrats. In November 2012, Hayes won a closely contested election by just 42 votes over her Republican opponent.

Hayes earned a B.A. in government from Bowdoin College in 1980. From 1991 to 2004, Hayes served on the MSAD 39 (Buckfield, Hartford, Sumner) School Board, including a stint as chair. She earned her MBA from Thomas College in Waterville, Maine in May 2014.

In 2014, Hayes endorsed unenrolled candidate for governor Eliot Cutler.

On December 3, 2014, Hayes was nominated by legislative Republicans to be State Treasurer of Maine, and she defeated the Democratic incumbent, Neria Douglass due to the support of Republicans and a minority of Democrats. She is the first independent to hold the office. Hayes has said one of her goals as treasurer is to create an online tool to allow the public to view and track how state bond money is spent, for greater transparency.

Hayes announced on April 14, 2017, that she has filed to run for Governor of Maine in 2018, stating she would seek to create a "collaborative" policy arena as opposed to what she sees as the current "conflict-centered" one. If elected, she would have been the first state treasurer to win the governor's office since 1889 when Edwin C. Burleigh was governor. She filed as a taxpayer-funded "Clean Elections" candidate.

Hayes finished third in the gubernatorial race, behind Democrat Janet Mills and Republican Shawn Moody. She received 37,268 votes, or 5.9%, in what was the worst showing for a major independent Maine gubernatorial candidate since John Michael's 2.1% in 2002.

After the election, the new Democratic-controlled Maine Legislature did not re-elect Hayes, instead electing Democrat Henry Beck.

References

External links
 Maine workers and employers deserve more attention published in the Bangor Daily News, November 26, 2012 by Terry Hayes and Paul Gilbert

21st-century American politicians
21st-century American women politicians
Bowdoin College alumni
Living people
Maine Democrats
Maine Independents
Members of the Maine House of Representatives
People from Buckfield, Maine
School board members in Maine
State treasurers of Maine
Women state legislators in Maine
Candidates in the 2018 United States elections
Women state constitutional officers of Maine
Thomas College alumni
1958 births